The Bajaj Priya is a three-speed, 150cc scooter that was manufactured in Pune, India for Maharashtra Scooters from 1975 until April 1992 under a license agreement with Bajaj Auto Limited. The design was very similar to that of the earlier "Bajaj 150" model, which was in turn based upon a Vespa 150 (VBA type) with a slightly modified body.

Differences from other models

Headset
Unlike the earlier Vespa and Bajaj 150 models, which used fully enclosed headsets, the Priya shared a headset with the more common Vespa Super, but was fitted with a round "volcano" style speedometer found on other Bajaj Scooters. The headset, which featured a non-enclosed bottom for easy access to cables, also had an integrated switch section, unlike the earlier Bajaj and Vespa 150, where it was joined separately and made of polished aluminum.

Horncast
Unlike the earlier Vespa and Bajaj 150 models, which usually sported the original Italian-style horncast with the older rectangular Piaggio monogram, the Priya used an angular horncast with a hexagonal Bajaj monogram similar to Vespa models produced in the early to mid 1970s.

Tail lamp
Unlike the earliest Indian-built Vespa 150s, which used the same aluminium tail lamps as the Italian-built Vespa VBA/GS150 design, the Priya came with a chromed-plastic Vespa Sprint type taillight.

See also 
 List of motor scooter manufacturers and brands

References

Priya
Indian motor scooters
Motorcycles introduced in 1975